Definition of Sound was a London-based dance-music group, consisting of Kevin Clark and Don Weekes, working with musicians Rex Brough (aka The Red King) and later Mike Spencer. Their second and fourth singles, "Wear Your Love Like Heaven" (1991) and "Moira Jane's Café" (1992) were in the Top 40 in the UK Singles Chart. The group also had several songs enter the U.S. Billboard Hot Dance Club Play chart, including "Moira Jane's Café", which hit No. 1 in 1992.

Career

Clark and Weekes first recorded together in 1988, using the name Top Billin. They released two songs, "Naturally" and "Straight From the Soul", on the Dance Yard record label before signing to Phonogram for the single " My Thing/Surprise". In 1990, the band signed to Circa in the UK and Cardiac in the US. Having changed their name to Definition of Sound, the duo recorded Love and Life: A Journey With the Chameleons (1991). The album featured four singles: "Now Is Tomorrow", "Wear Your Love Like Heaven", "Moira Jane's Cafe", and "Dream Girl". Vocal duties on "Now Is Tomorrow" and some album tracks were handled by singer, Elaine Vassel. The video for "Moira Jane's Cafe" was directed by Mark Romanek. 

Although they had no Billboard Hot 100 entries, the song "Now Is Tomorrow" (a No. 10 dance hit) climbed to No. 68 on the Hot 100 Airplay chart in 1991, whilst "Moira Jane's Cafe" became the first UK Rap record to become number 1 on the Billboard Dance Charts, earning the band accolades from their American peers. The album was well received by critics in the UK and America. 

The band recorded two more albums, The Lick (1992) and Experience (1996), Which Included Pass The Vibes, Which Reached No.49 on Triple J Hottest 100 of 1996, for different record labels and with different producers. In 1997 they released three promotional singles through MCA/Universal, in advance of a planned fourth album. Before the album was released, the band decided to stop recording.

Clark and Weekes' are featured as Definition of Sound on the Freestylers' single "Here We Go" (1998).

Initially, the final members Clark, Weekes, and Spencer continued as a songwriting remix and production team.

Clark went on to work in A&R and music publishing. He was also a recurring cast member on The Mayor of Kentish Town comedy radio show on Soho Radio, with Steve Furst (Little Britain/Lenny Beige) and Dominic Coleman (Miranda/Trollied).

Spencer has continued producing and recording musicians, as well as music publishing.

Weekes released a solo album before leaving the music industry.

Discography

Albums
Love and Life: A Journey With the Chameleons (1991) – UK #38, AUS #97.
The Lick (1992)
Experience (1996) – UK #97

Singles

Music videos
"Now Is Tomorrow" Directed by Mike Owen.
"Moira Jane's Café" Directed by Mark Romanek
"Child" Directed by Dani Jacobs

See also
List of number-one dance hits (United States)
List of artists who reached number one on the US Dance chart
List of performers on Top of the Pops
List of Peel sessions

References

British electronic musicians
British dance music groups
Mercury Records artists
Charisma Records artists
MCA Records artists